Dart to the Heart is an album by the Canadian folk rock musician Bruce Cockburn, released in 1994. Cockburn considered it to be primarily an album of love songs.

The album peaked at No. 176 on the Billboard 200. Its first single was "Listen for the Laugh", which was a hit on adult alternative airplay radio. Cockburn supported the album by touring with Patty Larkin.

Production
The album was produced by T Bone Burnett and mixed by Glyn Johns. It was recorded at Bearsville Studios, in New York, although it was Cockburn's original intention to record the "quieter" songs in Los Angeles with a different group of musicians. Greg Leisz played pedal steel on Dart to the Heart.

"Closer to the Light" is a tribute to the American musician Mark Heard, who died in 1992. "Train in the Rain" is an instrumental. "Scanning These Crowds" is about Louis Riel.

Critical reception

Entertainment Weekly wrote that the album "veers from boisterous to a little too sleepy, and includes some beautifully pithy lyrics." The Washington Post called the album Cockburn's best since World of Wonders, writing that it "is dominated by quiet love songs built around acoustic guitar and a refreshingly original take on pop music's most familiar subject." The Los Angeles Times considered it "tenderly hopeful in heart and slightly feisty in folk-rock spirit."

The Milwaukee Sentinel thought that "Cockburn has the intelligent folk rocker's respect for words and almost never writes a throwaway." The Indianapolis Star noted that "Listen for the Laugh" "has a Lou Reed-esque driving beat with edgy, flat vocals." The New York Times determined that the album's best songs "describe a domestic relationship as a precious, all-too-extingishable light in a dark, lonely world." The Calgary Herald concluded that Cockburn "looks within but not without sharpening his sense of observation, his sense of searching for meaning in the presence, the passion of another."

AllMusic called it "a convincing reminder of a gentler, more reflective Bruce Cockburn." Salon deemed it a "great lyrical" album.

Track listing

References

Bruce Cockburn albums
1994 albums
Columbia Records albums